One Stone is a nonprofit organization that promotes student voice and student leadership based in Boise, Idaho. Their stated mission is "Making students better leaders and the world a better place." They use the design thinking approach, pioneered at Stanford's Hasso Plattner Institute of Design, throughout their organization.

History 
Teresa and Joel Poppen founded One Stone in 2008. In 2015, One Stone received part of a $24.5 million dollar grant from the J.A. & Kathryn Albertson Family Foundation. The following year, One Stone received an additional $2.1 million of a $32 million total grant from the foundation.

Overview 
Two-thirds of One Stone's board of directors are students as mandated by the organization's bylaws.

Two Birds 
Two Birds is a student-led and operated creative design and marketing agency. Past clients include Albertsons, The Cabin, HQPBL, WASHTO, and various internal One Stone projects. Students in the Two Birds program work with clients using the design thinking process to develop logos, marketing strategies, websites, and other ventures. In 2018, Two Birds acquired Jason Sievers as Creative Director from advertising agency DaviesMoore.

Project Good 
Project Good is a community service program at One Stone that uses the design thinking process.

Hatch 
Hatch is a business incubator for student developed businesses.

One Stone Lab51 
One Stone Lab51 is an independent, tuition-free school consisting of roughly 125 students in the four-year program as of the fall of 2019. The first class started in the fall of 2016 and graduated in 2019. The program is different from traditional school, as it has no grades, opting for a portfolio and narrative transcript evaluation instead. Instead of teachers, the school has coaches, which support student-driven learning. In the spring of 2019, One Stone had 17 coaches, with 7 master's degrees and 4 doctoral degrees between them.

In the media 
One Stone was featured in a documentary by filmmaker Jon Long, called Rise: Voice of a New Generation. Long has produced documentaries for Disney, PBS, and National Geographic.

References 

Student organizations in the United States
One Stone
One Stone High School
One Stone High School
Non-profit organizations based in Idaho
Organizations based in Boise, Idaho